This is a list of award winners and league leaders for the Los Angeles Angels professional baseball team.

Awards

Most Valuable Player
Don Baylor
Vladimir Guerrero
Mike Trout
Shohei Ohtani

Cy Young
Dean Chance (1964)
Bartolo Colón

Rookie of the Year
Tim Salmon (1993)
Mike Trout (2012)
Shohei Ohtani (2018)

Hank Aaron Award
Mike Trout (2014, 2019)

Edgar Martínez Award
 Shohei Ohtani (2021, 2022)

AL Manager of the Year

See footnote
Mike Scioscia (2002, 2009)

All-MLB Team
 Mike Trout (1st team OF – 2019, 2020, 2022)
 Shohei Ohtani (1st team DH and 2nd team SP – 2021, 1st team SP and 2nd team DH – 2022)
 Raisel Iglesias (2nd team RP – 2021)

Gold Glove Award
Vic Power (1964)
Bobby Knoop (1966, 1967, 1968)
Jim Fregosi (1967)
Jim Spencer (1970)
Ken Berry (1972)
Rick Miller (1978)
Bob Boone (1982, 1986, 1987, 1988)
Gary Pettis (1985, 1986)
Devon White (1988, 1989)
Mark Langston (1991, 1992, 1993, 1994, 1995)
J. T. Snow (1995, 1996)
Jim Edmonds (1997, 1998)
Darin Erstad (2002, 2004)
Bengie Molina (2002)
Orlando Cabrera (2007)
Torii Hunter
Erick Aybar (2011)
Kole Calhoun (2015)
Martin Maldonado (2017)
Andrelton Simmons (2017)
Griffin Canning (2020)

Wilson Overall Defensive Player of the Year

See explanatory note at Atlanta Braves award winners and league leaders.
Mike Trout (in American League) (2012)

Wilson Defensive Player of the Year Award
Team (all positions)
Mike Trout (2012)
J. B. Shuck (2013)

Silver Slugger Award
Bobby Grich & Rick Burleson (1981)
Reggie Jackson & Doug DeCinces (1982)
Lance Parrish (1990)
Tim Salmon (1995)
Darin Erstad (2000)
Troy Glaus (2000)
Garret Anderson (2002, 2003)
Vladimir Guerrero (2004, 2005)
Torii Hunter
Mike Trout (2015, 2016, 2018, 2019, 2022)
Shohei Ohtani

Edgar Martínez Award
Shohei Ohtani

MLB "This Year in Baseball Awards"

Note: These awards were renamed the "GIBBY Awards" in 2010 and then the "Esurance MLB Awards" in 2015.

"GIBBY Awards" Best Everyday Player
 – Mike Trout

World Series MVP Award
 – Troy Glaus

ALCS MVP Award
See: League Championship Series Most Valuable Player Award
 – Fred Lynn
 – Adam Kennedy

All-Star Game MVP Award
Note: This was re-named the Ted Williams Most Valuable Player Award in 2002.
 – Leon Wagner
 – Fred Lynn
 – Garret Anderson
 - Mike Trout

All-Star Game—Home Run Derby champion
See: Home Run Derby
 – Wally Joyner
 – Garret Anderson
 – Vladimir Guerrero

DHL Hometown Heroes (2006)
Rod Carew — voted by MLB fans as the most outstanding player in the history of the franchise, based on on-field performance, leadership quality and character value

Franchise Four (2015)

 Vladimir Guerrero

 Nolan Ryan

 Tim Salmon

 Mike Trout

Baseball America Major League Player of the Year

Mike Trout (2012, 2013, 2016)

Baseball America All-Rookie Team
See: Baseball America#Baseball America All-Rookie Team
2011 – Jordan Walden (RP; one of two)

Topps All-Star Rookie teams

 — Lee Thomas (OF)
 — Dean Chance (RHP) & Buck Rodgers (C)
 — Jose Cardenal (OF), Marcelino Lopez (LHP) & Paul Schaal (3B)
 — Frank Tanana (LHP)
 — Jerry Remy (2B)
 — Mark Clear (RHP)
 — Wally Joyner (1B)
 — Devon White (OF)
 — Jim Abbott (LHP)
 — Tim Salmon (OF) & J. T. Snow (1B)
 — Brian Anderson (LHP)
 — Garret Anderson (OF)
 — Jason Dickson (RHP) & Mike Holtz (LHP)
 — Adam Kennedy (2B) & Bengie Molina (C)
 — Shawn Wooten (C)
 — Mark Trumbo (1B)
 — Mike Trout (OF)
 — Shohei Ohtani (P/DH)

Branch Rickey Award
 — Torii Hunter

The Sporting News Manager of the Year Award

See footnote
Bill Rigney (1962) (in both leagues)
Mike Scioscia (2002, 2009) (in AL)

Baseball America Manager of the Year
See: Baseball America#Major League Baseball awards
See footnote
Mike Scioscia (2002, 2009)

Associated Press Manager of the Year
See: Associated Press#AP sports awards
See footnote
Bill Rigney (1962) (in AL)

Team award
2002 – William Harridge Trophy (American League champion)
 – Commissioner's Trophy (World Series)
2003 (2002 Anaheim Angels) – Outstanding Team ESPY Award

Team records (single-season and career)

Minor-league system

Baseball America Minor League Player of the Year Award

 – Tim Salmon (Edmonton Trappers; AAA)
2011 – Mike Trout (Arkansas Travelers; AA)

Minor League Baseball Yearly (MiLBY) Awards Hitter of the Year
 – Roberto Lopez (Orem Owlz)

Sporting News Minor League Organization of the Year

 – Los Angeles Angels of Anaheim

Minor League News Farm System of the Year
 – Los Angeles Angels of Anaheim

Other achievements

Hall of Famers
See: Los Angeles Angels of Anaheim#Baseball Hall of Famers

Angels Hall of Fame
See: Los Angeles Angels of Anaheim#Angels Hall of Fame

California Sports Hall of Fame

Retired numbers
See: Los Angeles Angels of Anaheim#Retired numbers

Gene Autry Trophy
The Gene Autry Trophy, named for former Angels owner Gene Autry, is given to the team most valuable player. The award is voted on by the players.

Nick Adenhart Award
The Nick Adenhart Pitcher of the Year Award, named for former Angels player Nick Adenhart, is given to an Angels pitcher for outstanding performance throughout the regular season. The award is voted on by the players.

American League statistical leaders (batting)

Batting Average
Alex Johnson .329

Slugging Percentage
Bobby Grich .543 (1981)
Mike Trout .590 (2015)
Mike Trout .629 (2017)

Games
Sandy Alomar Sr. 162 (1970) Co-Leader
Sandy Alomar Sr. 162 (1971)
Don Baylor 162 (1979) Co-Leader
Rick Burleson 109 (1981) Co-Leader

At Bats
Sandy Alomar Sr. 689 (1971)
Darin Erstad 676 (2000)

Runs
Albie Pearson 115 (1962)
Don Baylor 120 (1979)
Vladimir Guerrero 124 (2004)
Mike Trout 129 (2012)
Mike Trout 109 (2013)
Mike Trout 115 (2014)
Mike Trout 123 (2016)

Hits
Darin Erstad 240 (2000)

Total Bases
Vladimir Guerrero 366 (2004)
Mike Trout 338 (2014)

Doubles
Garret Anderson 56 (2002) Co-Leader
Garret Anderson 49 (2003) Co-Leader

Triples
Bobby Knoop 11 (1966)
Jim Fregosi 13 (1968)
Mickey Rivers 11 (1974)
Mickey Rivers 13 (1975) Co-Leader
Shohei Ohtani 8 (2021) Co-Leader

Home Runs
Bobby Grich 22 (1981) Co-Leader
Reggie Jackson 39 (1982) Co-Leader
Troy Glaus 47 (2000)

RBI
Don Baylor 139 (1979)
Mike Trout 111 (2014)

Walks
Brian Downing 106 (1987) Co-Leader
Mike Trout 110 (2013)
Mike Trout 116 (2016)
Mike Trout 122 (2018)

Strikeouts
Reggie Jackson 156 (1982)
Mo Vaughn 181 (2000)
Mike Trout 184 (2014)

Stolen Bases
Mickey Rivers 70 (1975)
Mike Trout 49 (2012)

Singles
Albie Pearson 139 (1963)
Alex Johnson 156 (1970)
Garret Anderson 142 (1997) Co-Leader
Darin Erstad 170 (2000)

Hit By Pitch
Rick Reichardt 13 (1966)
Don Baylor 18 (1978)
David Eckstein 21 (2001)
David Eckstein 27 (2002)

Sacrifice Hits
Jim Fregosi 15 (1965)
Tim Foli 26 (1982)
Luis Sojo 19 (1991)
David Eckstein 16 (2001)
David Eckstein 14 (2002)

Sacrifice Flies
Bobby Knoop 7 (1966) Co-Leader
Roger Repoz 8 (1968) Co-Leader
Don Baylor 12 (1978)
Dan Ford 13 (1979) Co-Leader
Carney Lansford 11 (1980)
Wally Joyner 12 (1986)
Chili Davis 10 (1988) Co-Leader

Intentional Walks
Vladimir Guerrero 26 (2005)
Vladimir Guerrero 25 (2006)
Vladimir Guerrero 28 (2007)
Vladimir Guerrero 16 (2008)
Mike Trout 15 (2017)
Mike Trout 25 (2018)
Shohei Ohtani 20 (2021)

Grounded into Double Plays
Lyman Bostock 26 (1978)
Vladimir Guerrero 27 (2008)

At Bats per Strikeout
Tim Foli 21.8 (1982)
Bengie Molina 14.3 (2000)
David Eckstein 11.6 (2004)

At Bats per Home Run
Bobby Grich 16.0 (1981)
Reggie Jackson 13.6 (1982)

Outs
Sandy Alomar Sr. 536 (1971)
Devon White 517 (1989)
Chad Curtis 369 (1994)

Runs Created
Vladimir Guerrero 140 (2004)
Mike Trout 155 (2013)
Mike Trout 137 (2014)

Adj. On-Base Plus Slugging
Bobby Grich 165 (1981)
Mike Trout 171 (2012)

Adj. Batting Runs
Vladimir Guerrero 51 (2004)
Mike Trout 56 (2014)

Adj. Batting Wins
Vladimir Guerrero 4.7 (2004)
Mike Trout 5.6 (2014)

Power-Speed Number
Bobby Bonds 38.9 (1977)
Darin Erstad 26.4 (2000)
Mike Trout 37.2 (2012)
Mike Trout 29.7 (2013)
Shohei Ohtani 33.2 (2021)

Offensive Win Perc.
Mike Trout .786 (2012)

Win Probability Added
Mike Trout 5.3 (2012)
Mike Trout 6.9 (2014)
Shohei Ohtani 5.1 (2021)

Wins Above Replacement (Baseball Reference)
Dean Chance 8.6 (1964)
Mike Trout 10.9 (2012)
Mike Trout 8.9 (2013)
Mike Trout 7.9 (2014)
Shohei Ohtani 9.1 (2021)

Wins Above Replacement for Position Players (Baseball-Reference)
Mike Trout 10.9 (2012)
Mike Trout 8.9 (2013)
Mike Trout 7.9 (2014)

Offensive Wins Above Replacement (Baseball Reference)
Tim Salmon 7.2 (1995) Co-Leader
Mike Trout 8.8 (2012)
Mike Trout 9.7 (2013)
Mike Trout 8.7 (2014)

American League statistical leaders (pitching)

ERA
Dean Chance 1.65
Frank Tanana 2.54 (1977)

Wins
Dean Chance 20 (1964) Co-Leader (A.L CY YOUNG WINNER)
Bartolo Colón 21 (2005)
Jered Weaver 20 (2012) Co-Leader

WHIP
Frank Tanana 0.988 (1976)
Jered Weaver 1.018 (2012)

Hits Allowed/9IP
Andy Messersmith 6.08 (1969)
Andy Messersmith 6.66 (1970)
Nolan Ryan 5.26 (1972)
Nolan Ryan 5.98 (1974)
Nolan Ryan 6.11 (1976)
Nolan Ryan 5.96 (1977)
Nolan Ryan 6.83 (1979)
Jered Weaver 7.01 (2012)

Strikeouts/9IP
Nolan Ryan 10.43 (1972)
Nolan Ryan 10.57 (1973)
Nolan Ryan 9.93 (1974)
Frank Tanana 9.41 (1975)
Nolan Ryan 10.35 (1976)
Nolan Ryan 10.26 (1977)
Nolan Ryan 9.97 (1978)
Nolan Ryan 9.01 (1979)

Saves
Minnie Rojas 27 (1967)
Bryan Harvey 46 (1991)
Francisco Rodríguez 45 (2005) Co-Leader
Francisco Rodríguez 47 (2006)
Francisco Rodríguez 62 (2008) MLB RECORD

Innings
Dean Chance 278 ⅓ (1964)
Nolan Ryan 332 ⅔ (1974)
Chuck Finley ⅓ (1994)

Strikeouts
Nolan Ryan 329 (1972)
Nolan Ryan 383 (1973)MLB RECORD
Nolan Ryan 367 (1974)
Frank Tanana 269 (1975)
Nolan Ryan 327 (1976)
Nolan Ryan 341 (1977)
Nolan Ryan 260 (1978)
Nolan Ryan 223 (1979)
Jered Weaver 233 (2010)

Games Started
Chuck Finley 25 (1994) Co-Leader
Jered Weaver 34 (2010)

Complete Games
Dean Chance 15 (1964)
Nolan Ryan 22 (1977) Co-Leader
Chuck Finley 13 (1993)

Shutouts
Dean Chance 11 (1964)
Jim McGlothlin 6 (1967) Co-Leader
Nolan Ryan 9 (1972)
Nolan Ryan 7 (1976)
Frank Tanana 7 (1977)
Nolan Ryan 5 (1979) Co-Leader
Ken Forsch 4 (1981) Co-Leader
Geoff Zahn 5 (1984) Co-Leader
Bert Blyleven 5 (1989)
John Lackey 2 (2003) Co-Leader

Home Runs Allowed
Geoff Zahn 18 (1981) Co-Leader
Willie Fraser 33 (1988)
Shawn Boskie 40 (1996) Co-Leader
Allen Watson 37 (1997)
Ramón Ortiz 40 (2002)
Jarrod Washburn 34 (2003) Co-Leader

Walks Allowed
Bo Belinsky 122 (1962)
Dean Chance 114 (1966)
Nolan Ryan 157 (1972)
Nolan Ryan 162 (1973)
Nolan Ryan 202 (1974)
Nolan Ryan 183 (1976)
Nolan Ryan 204 (1977)
Nolan Ryan 148 (1978)

Hits Allowed
Tommy John 287 (1983)
Jim Abbott 246 (1990)

Strikeout to Walk
Frank Tanana 3.68 (1975)
Frank Tanana 3.58 (1976)

Losses
George Brunet 19 (1967)
George Brunet 17 (1968)
Nolan Ryan 18 (1976)
Kirk McCaskill 19 (1991)
Jim Abbott 18 (1996)

Earned Runs Allowed
Geoff Zahn 79 (1981)
Mike Witt 111 (1989) Co-Leader

Wild Pitches
Andy Messersmith 16 (1969) Co-Leader
Tom Murphy 16 (1969) Co-Leader
Tom Murphy 17 (1971)
Nolan Ryan 18 (1972)
Nolan Ryan 21 (1977)
Nolan Ryan 13 (1978)
Chuck Finley 17 (1996)
Chuck Finley 15 (1999)

Hit Batsmen
Ken McBride 14 (1963)
Ken McBride 16 (1964)
Marcelino López 9 (1966)
Tom Murphy 21 (1969)
Mike Witt 11 (1981) Co-Leader
Ken Forsch 11 (1982)
Mark Leiter 9 (1994)
Shawn Boskie 13 (1996) Co-Leader
Jason Grimsley 13 (1996 Co-Leader)

Batters Faced
Nolan Ryan 1,392 (1974)
Nolan Ryan 1,272 (1977)
Chuck Finley 774 (1994)

Games Finished
Minnie Rojas 53 (1967)
Bryan Harvey 63 (1991)
Francisco Rodríguez 69 (2008)

Oldest Player
Art Fowler 41 (1964)
Hoyt Wilhelm 46 (1969)
Orlando Peña 40 (1974)
Orlando Peña 41 (1975)
Mike Cuellar 40 (1977)
Ron Fairly 39 (1978)
Andrés Galarraga 43 (2004)

Youngest Player
Ed Kirkpatrick 17 (1962)
Willie Montañez 18 (1966)
Lloyd Allen 19 (1969)
Brian Harper 19 (1979)
Miguel García 20 (1987)
Francisco Rodríguez 20 (2002)
Mike Trout 19 (2011)

See also
Baseball awards
List of MLB awards

Footnotes

Major League Baseball team trophies and awards
Awa